Tokyo Metro and Toei Subway own or use the following types of rolling stock.

Tokyo Metro

Ginza Line
Trains on the Ginza Line run in three-door six-car formations with no through trains into other suburban rail lines in Greater Tokyo.

Present
Tokyo Metro 1000 series (since 11 April 2012)

Former
Tokyo Rapid Railway 100 series (from 1938 until 1968)
Tokyo Underground Railway 1000 series (from 1927 until 1968)
Tokyo Underground Railway 1100 series (from 1930 until 1968)
Tokyo Underground Railway 1200 series (from 1934 until 1986)
TRTA 1300 series (from 1949 until 1986)
TRTA 1400 series (from 1953 until 1985)
TRTA 1500 series (from 1954 until 1986)
TRTA 1500N series (from 1968 until 1993)
TRTA 1600 series (from 1955 until 1986)
TRTA 1700 series (from 1956 until 1986)
TRTA 1800 series (from 1958 until 1986)
TRTA 1900 series (from 1958 until 1987)
TRTA 2000 series (from 1958 until 1993)
Tokyo Metro 01 series (from 1983 until 2017)

Marunouchi Line
Trains on the Marunouchi Line run in three-door six-car formations with no through trains into other suburban rail lines in Greater Tokyo.

Present
Tokyo Metro 02 series (since 1988 - 02-80 subseries 3-car sets used on the Hōnanchō branch line)
Tokyo Metro 2000 series (since 2019)

Former
TRTA 300/400/500/900 series (from 1954 until 1996, later sold and exported for use on Line B of the Buenos Aires Metro)
Tokyo Rapid Railway 100 series (from 1962 until 1968, transferred from Ginza Line, used for Hōnanchō branch only)
TRTA 2000 series (from 1968 until 1981, used for Hōnanchō branch only)

Hibiya Line
Hibiya Line trains are 20 m long 7-car formations, with four doors per side. Tokyu Corporation formerly operated trains from the Tokyu Toyoko Line into the Hibiya Line from 1964 until 2013, when through-services between the Toyoko Line and the Tokyo Metro Fukutoshin Line commenced operations.

Present
Tokyo Metro
Tokyo Metro 13000 series (since 25 March 2017)
Tobu Railway
Tobu 70000 series (since 7 July 2017)
Tobu 70090 series (since March 2020)

Former
TRTA/Tokyo Metro
TRTA 3000 series (from 1961 until July 1994)
Tokyo Metro 03 series (from 1988 until 28 February 2020)
Tobu Railway
Tobu 2000 series (from 1962 until 1993)
Tobu 20000 series (from 1988 until 27 March 2020)
Tokyu Corporation
Tokyu 7000 series (original) (from 1964 until 1991)
Tokyu 1000 series (from 1991 until 2013)

Tōzai Line
Tōzai Line trains are 20 m long 10-car formations, with four doors per side and longitudinal seating. The maximum operating speed is 100 km/h.

Present
Tokyo Metro
Tokyo Metro 05/05N series (since 1988)
Tokyo Metro 07 series (since 2006) (transferred from Yūrakuchō Line)
Tokyo Metro 15000 series (since 2010)
Tōyō Rapid Railway
Tōyō Rapid 2000 series (since 2004)
East Japan Railway Company (JR East)
JR East E231-800 series (since 2003)

Former
TRTA/Tokyo Metro
Tokyo Metro 5000 series (from 1964 until 2007)
Tokyo Metro 8000 series (from 1987 until 1988, temporary, built for Hanzōmon Line)
JNR/JR East
JR East 301 series (from 1966 until 2003)
JR East 103-1000 series (from 1989 until 2003)
JR East 103-1200 series (from 1971 until 2003)
Tōyō Rapid
Tōyō Rapid 1000 series (from 1996 until 2006)

Chiyoda Line
Chiyoda Line trains are 20 m long 10-car formations, with four doors per side and longitudinal seating. Kita-Ayase Branch service trains run in three-car formations.

Present
Tokyo Metro
Tokyo Metro 16000 series (since November 2010)
Tokyo Metro 05 series (since April 2014, used on Kita-Ayase Branch in 3-car formations)
Odakyu Electric Railway
Odakyu 4000 series (since September 2007)
Odakyu 60000 series MSE (since spring 2008, used for Metro Hakone, Metro Enoshima, Metro Morning Way and Metro Home Way)
JR East
JR East E233-2000 series (since summer 2009)

Former
TRTA/Tokyo Metro
Tokyo Metro 5000 series (from 1969 until 2014, used on Kita-Ayase Branch in 3-car formations)
Tokyo Metro 6000 series (prototype built in 1968, used on Kita-Ayase Branch in 3-car formation)
Tokyo Metro 06 series (from 1993 until January 2015)
Tokyo Metro 07 series (from September until December 2008, transferred to Tōzai Line)
Tokyo Metro 6000 series (from 1971 until November 2018)
Odakyu
Odakyu 9000 series (from 1978 until 1990)
Odakyu 1000 series (from 1989 until 2010)
JNR/JR East
JR 103 series (from 1970 until 1986; transferred to Joban Line rapid services afterwards)
JR 203 series (from 1982 until September 2011; 90 were transferred to overseas operations)
JR 207-900 series (from 1986 until December 2009)
JR 209-1000 series (x2) (from December 1999 until October 2018; transferred to Chuo Line Rapid Service by December 2018.)

Yūrakuchō/Fukutoshin Lines
Yūrakuchō/Fukutoshin Line trains are 20 m long 10-car (8-car for some Fukutoshin Line trains) formations, with four doors per side and longitudinal seating.

Present
Tokyo Metro
Tokyo Metro 10000 series (since September 2006)
Tokyo Metro 17000 series (since February 2021)
Tobu Railway
Tobu 9000/9050 series (since 1987)
Tobu 50070 series (since July 2007)
Seibu Railway
Seibu 6000/6050 series (since 1998)
Seibu 40000 series (since 25 March 2017, used for S-Train)
Tokyu Corporation and Yokohama Minatomirai Railway (Fukutoshin Line only)
Tokyu 5050 series (since 16 March 2013)
Tokyu 5050-4000 series (since 10 September 2012)
Yokohama Minatomirai Railway Y500 series (since 16 March 2013)

Former
TRTA/Tokyo Metro
Tokyo Metro 07 series (from 1993 until 2007, transferred to Tōzai Line)
Odakyu Electric Railway (Yūrakuchō Line only)
Tokyo Metro 7000 series (from 1974 until April 2022)
Odakyu 60000 series MSE (used for Bay Resort occasionally)

Hanzōmon Line
Hanzōmon Line trains are 20 m long 10-car formations, with four doors per side and longitudinal seating.

Present
Tokyo Metro
Tokyo Metro 8000 series (since 1981)
Tokyo Metro 08 series (since 2003)
Tokyo Metro 18000 series (since 2021)
Tokyu Corporation
Tokyu 5000 series (since 2002)
Tokyu 8500 series (since 1978)
Tokyu 2020 series (since 2018)
Tobu Railway
Tobu 30000 series (from 2003 until June 2021)
Tobu 50050 series (since 2006)
Tobu 50000 series (since September 2020)

Former
Tokyu Corporation
Tokyu 2000 series (from 1992 until 2018)
Tokyu 8590 series (from 1988 until 2019)

Namboku Line
Namboku Line trains are 20 m long 6-car/8-car formations, with four doors per side.

Present
Tokyo Metro
Tokyo Metro 9000 series (since 1991)
Saitama Rapid Railway
Saitama Rapid Railway 2000 series (since 2001)
Tokyu Corporation
Tokyu 3000 series (since 2000)
Tokyu 5080 series (since 2003)
Tokyu 3020 series (since 5 January 2020)

Toei Subway

Toei Asakusa Line
Toei Asakusa Line trains are 18 m long 8-car formations, with three doors per side. They are also of standard gauge (1435mm) as opposed to the 1067mm gauge used on most Japanese rail lines.

Present
Toei
Toei 5300 series (since 1991)
Toei 5500 series (since June 2018)
Keisei Electric Railway, Hokusō Railway, Chiba New Town Railway and Shibayama Railway
Keisei 3000 series (II) (since 2003)
Keisei 3050 series (II) (since 2010)
 Keisei 3100 series (II) (since 26 October 2019)
Keisei 3400 series (since 1993)
Keisei 3600 series (since 1982)
Keisei 3700 series (since 1991)
Hokuso 7300 series (since 1991)
Hokuso 7500 series (since 2006)
Chiba New Town Railway 9100 series "C-flyer" (since 1994)
Chiba New Town Railway 9200 series (since 2013)
Chiba New Town Railway 9800 series (since 21 March 2017)
Keikyu Corporation
Keikyu 1500 series (since 1985)
Keikyu 600 series (since 1994)
Keikyu N1000 series (since 2002)

Former
Toei
Toei 5000 series (from 1960 until 1995)
Toei 5200 series (from 1976 until 2006)
Keisei Electric Railway, Hokusō Railway, Chiba New Town Railway and Shibayama Railway
Keisei 1000 series (from 1988 until 1991)
Keisei 3000 series (I) (from 1960 until 1991)
Keisei 3050 series (I) (from 1960 until 1993)
Keisei 3100 series (I) (until 1995)
Keisei 3150 series (until 1998)
Keisei 3200 series (until 2007)
Keisei 3300 series (until 2008)
Keisei 3500 series (from 1972 until 2015)
Keisei 3600 series (from 1982 until 2020)
Hokuso 7050 series (from 1995 until 2003)
Hokuso 7150 series (from 1991 until 1997)
Hokuso 7000 series (from 1991 until 2007)
Hokuso 7250 series (from 2003 until 2006)
Hokuso 7260 series (from 2006 until 2015)
Chiba New Town Railway 9000 series (from 1991 until 2017)
Shibayama Railway 3600 series (from 2002 until 2013)
Keikyu Corporation
Keikyu 1000 series (from 1968 until 2008)

Toei Mita Line
Toei Mita Line trains are 20 m long 6/8-car formations with four doors per side.

Present
Toei
Toei 6300 series (since 1993) 
Toei 6500 series (8 car trains)(since 2022) 
Tokyu Corporation
Tokyu 3000 series (since 2000)
Tokyu 5080 series (since 2003)
Tokyu 3020 series (since October 2019)

Former
Toei
Toei 6000 series (from 1968 until 1999)

Toei Shinjuku Line
Toei Shinjuku Line trains operate in 20 m long 8/10-car formations and have four doors per side. They also use a 1372mm track gauge.

Present
Toei
Toei 10-300 series (since 2005)
Keio Corporation
Keio 9030 series (since 2006)
Keio 5000 series (since 2017)

Former
Toei
Toei 10-000 series (from 1978 until 2018)
Toei 10-300R series (from 2005 until 2017)
Keio Corporation
Keio 6030 series (from 1980 until 2011)

Toei Ōedo Line
Toei 12-000 series (since 1991)
Toei 12-600 series (since 2011)

See also
Tokyo subway

References

 
 
Tokyo subway
Lists of rolling stock